Notonomus kingi is a species of ground beetle in the subfamily Pterostichinae. It was described by W.S. Macleay in 1826.

References

Notonomus
Beetles described in 1826